Cammack is an unincorporated community in Mount Pleasant Township, Delaware County, Indiana.

History
Cammack was founded in 1882. A sawmill was built there by David Cammack. The sawmill burned in 1893 and was not rebuilt.

A post office was established at Cammack in 1882, and remained in operation until it was discontinued in 1907.

Geography

References

Unincorporated communities in Delaware County, Indiana
Unincorporated communities in Indiana